KWJD may refer to:

 KWJD-LP, a low-power radio station (92.1 FM) licensed to serve Onalaska, Washington, United States
 KWJD-LP (defunct), a defunct low-power television station (channel 25) formerly licensed to serve Van Nuys, California, United States